WLGI, known as "Radio Baháʼí", is licensed to Hemingway, South Carolina, and broadcasts at 90.9 FM. The station broadcasts a variety of programming, both religious and secular. The station is licensed by the FCC for noncommercial Class C1 operation and is operated by the Louis G. Gregory Baháʼí Institute, named after Hand of the Cause Louis George Gregory, a prominent African-American Baháʼí.  It serves Horry, Georgetown, Williamsburg, Florence and Marion counties, in South Carolina, areas for which the station also provides announcements, partners with local organizations and agencies, and supports remote broadcasts.

See Baháʼí Faith in South Carolina.

References

External links
www.wlgi.org — Official web site of WLGI Radio Baháʼí

 https://www.radiobahai.us/on-air/ - WLGI Program Page 
 https://www.radiobahai.us/about/about-radio-bahai/ About Radio Baha’i

LGI
Religious broadcasting in the United States
Bahá'í Faith in the United States
Radio stations established in 1983
Religion in South Carolina